Joseph Sharp received his B.S., M.S., and Ph.D. in Psychology and Neuroanatomy from the University of Utah.

In 1961, he began his career as a research psychologist at the Walter Reed Army Institute of Research where, in 1970, he was appointed deputy director of Neuropsychiatry. He has also served as Chief of the Department of Experimental Psychology and Behavioral Radiology at Walter Reed, and in 1969 and 1970, was Deputy Commissioner of Public Health for the State of New York. He came to ARC in 1974, and the last five of those years, served as Director of Space Research at the Ames Research Center. Currently he is on the faculty at the College of Science at the Southern Utah University, Cedar City, Utah.

References

Living people
University of Utah alumni
Southern Utah University faculty
21st-century American psychologists
Year of birth missing (living people)